Dolane is a settlement on the right bank of the Drava River in the Municipality of Cirkulane in the Haloze area of eastern Slovenia. The area traditionally belonged to the Styria region. It is now included in the Drava Statistical Region.

Cultural heritage
Borl Castle is located northeast of the main settlement in Dolane.

References

External links
Dolane on Geopedia

Populated places in the Municipality of Cirkulane